Geisha are traditional Japanese female entertainers.

Geisha may also refer to:

Film and theatre
The Geisha, an 1896 British musical
The Geisha (1914 film), an American short silent film using music from the musical
A Geisha, a 1953 Japanese film
The Geisha (1983 film), a Japanese film

Other uses
Geisha (band), an Australian rock band
Geisha (coffee), an Ethiopian coffee variety
Geisha (video game), a 1990 adventure video game
Geisha Handicap, an American horse race
Geisha Williams (born 1961/62), Cuban American businesswoman
Geisha: A Life, a 2002 autobiography by Mineko Iwasaki
"Geisha (The Tokyo VIP)", a song by Ghastly from The Mystifying Oracle, 2018
1047 Geisha, a main-belt asteroid
Ulmus parvifolia 'Geisha', a Chinese Elm cultivar
The Lady, the main antagonist of Little Nightmares, sometimes referred to as “The Geisha” by fans
Geisha (chocolate), hazelnut-filled milk chocolate made by Fazer

See also